Grover Gibson (born 18 November 1978) is an American soccer player who last played for Rot-Weiss Ahlen in the 2. Bundesliga until retiring due to injury in August 2009.

In 2012, Gibson established the Grover Gibson Soccer Foundation, which is a non-profit corporation, where he founded Fredericksburg FC and is currently head coach.

Club career
Born in Fairfax, Virginia, after graduating from high school, Gibson signed with VfB Stuttgart U-18. He went on to play two years for VfB Stuttgart reserves. After that he played for third-tier sides FC Augsburg and SV Elversberg before signing with 1. FSV Mainz 05 in the 2. Bundesliga at the age of 21. Later he played again in the third tier for SSV Jahn Regensburg, SC Preußen Münster, Kickers Emden. His last club was Rot-Weiss Ahlen in the 2. Bundesliga where he played 30 matches and scored six goals.

His professional career ending after fracturing the eye socket which also damaged the retina and optic nerve.

Gibson previously played four matches in the 2. Bundesliga for 1. FSV Mainz 05.

Coaching career
Following the creation of the Grover Gibson Soccer Foundation, a non-profit corporation promoting soccer, Gibson founded RVA FC (now Fredericksburg FC), as a youth soccer organization in Richmond, Virginia, with the senior men's team to compete in the amateur National Premier Soccer League (NPSL), considered the fourth tier of the American soccer pyramid. Gibson would coach the club in its inaugural season, leading them to a first-place finish in the Mid-Atlantic Division and all the way to the NPSL Championship game against the Sonoma County Sol.

Personal life 
Gibson resides currently in Fredericksburg, Virginia with his wife and three children.

References

External links
 Grover Gibson at kicker.de 

1978 births
Living people
American soccer players
Association football midfielders
Rot Weiss Ahlen players
1. FSV Mainz 05 players
SC Preußen Münster players
VfB Stuttgart II players
Kickers Emden players
SV Elversberg players
SSV Jahn Regensburg players
FC Augsburg players
2. Bundesliga players
American expatriate soccer players in Germany
Soccer players from Virginia
United States men's youth international soccer players
United States men's under-20 international soccer players
American expatriate soccer players